Abingdon Downs is a rural locality in the Shire of Etheridge, Queensland, Australia.

Geography 
The Einasleigh River flows through the locality from south-east to west. Its tributary, the Etheridge River, flows through the locality from south to west with their confluence in the west of the locality.

Its homestead is located in the west of the locality with the Abingdon Downs Airport immediately to the south. As at 2016, the station was carrying 16,000 Brahman cattle.

History

References 

Shire of Etheridge
Localities in Queensland